The Fifth and Main Downtown Historic District is a national historic district located in downtown Richmond, Virginia. The district encompasses 38 contributing buildings and 1 contributing object located south of the Grace Street Commercial Historic District. It reflects the core of the city's early-20th century retail development. The district includes representative examples of the Federal, Greek Revival, Classical Revival and International Style architecture built between the mid-19th and mid-20th centuries. Notable buildings include the Equitable Life Insurance Building (1951), the Massey Building (1952, 1963–64), and 400 East Main Street (1951).  Located in the district is the separately listed St. Alban's Hall (1869).

It was added to the National Register of Historic Places in 2006, with a boundary increase in 2012.

References

Historic districts on the National Register of Historic Places in Virginia
Commercial buildings on the National Register of Historic Places in Virginia
Federal architecture in Virginia
Greek Revival architecture in Virginia
Neoclassical architecture in Virginia
International style architecture in Virginia
Buildings and structures in Richmond, Virginia
National Register of Historic Places in Richmond, Virginia